Queensland is an unincorporated community in Ben Hill County, Georgia, United States. It lies along U.S. Route 129 north of the city of Fitzgerald, the county seat of Ben Hill County. Its elevation is 249 feet (76 m). The community is part of the Fitzgerald Micropolitan Statistical Area.

References

Unincorporated communities in Ben Hill County, Georgia
Unincorporated communities in Georgia (U.S. state)
Fitzgerald, Georgia micropolitan area